The Amorites (Akkadian: 𒀀𒈬𒊒𒌝  or 	𒋾𒀉𒉡𒌝/𒊎 ;) were an ancient Northwest Semitic-speaking people from the Levant who also occupied large parts of southern Mesopotamia from the 21st century BC to the end of the 17th century BC, where they established several prominent city-states in existing locations, such as Isin, Larsa and later notably Babylon, creating the Old Babylonian Empire. The term  in Akkadian and Sumerian texts refers to the Amorites, their principal deity and an Amorite kingdom. The term Amorite was never used in contemporary sources before the 1st Millennium BC. The Amorites are mentioned in the Bible as inhabitants of Canaan both before and after the conquest of the land under Joshua.

History

Third Millennium BC
In two Sumerian literary compositions written long afterward, in the Old Babylonian period, Enmerkar and the Lord of Aratta and Lugalbanda and the Anzud bird the Early Dynastic ruler of Uruk, listed in the Sumerian King List,mentions "the land of the ". It is not known to what extent these reflect historical facts.

There are also sparse mentions about Amorites (often as Mar-duki) in tablets from the East Semitic-speaking kingdom of Ebla, dating from 2500 BC to the destruction of the city in  BC. From the perspective of the Eblaites, the Amorites were a rural group living in the narrow basin of the middle and upper Euphrates in northern Syria. For the Akkadian kings of central Mesopotamia  was one of the "Four Quarters" surrounding Akkad, along with Subartu, Sumer, and Elam. Naram-Sin of Akkad records in a royal inscription defeating a coalition of Sumerian cities and Amorites near Jebel Bishri in northern Syria  BC. His successor, Shar-Kali-Sharri recorded in one of his year names "In the year in which Szarkaliszarri was victorious over Amurru in the Djebel Biszri".

By the time of the last days of the Third Dynasty of Ur, the immigrating Amorites had become such a force that kings such as Shu-Sin were obliged to construct a  wall from the Tigris to the Euphrates to hold them off. The Amorites are depicted in contemporary records as nomadic tribes under chiefs, who forced themselves into lands they needed to graze their herds. Some of the Akkadian literature of this era speaks disparagingly of the Amorites and implies that the Akkadian- and Sumerian-speakers of Mesopotamia viewed their nomadic and primitive way of life with disgust and contempt. In the Sumerian myth Marriage of Martu, written early in the 2nd Millennium BC a goddess considering marriage to the god of the Amorites is warned:

As the centralized structure of the Third Dynasty of Ur slowly collapsed the city-states of the south such as Isin, Larsa and Eshnunna, began to reassert their former independence, and the areas in southern Mesopotamia with Amorites were no exception. Elsewhere, the armies of Elam were attacking and weakening the empire, making it vulnerable.  Ur was eventually occupied by the Elamites. Remaining until ejected by Isin ruler Ishbi-Erra marking the beginning of the Isin-Larsa period.

2nd Millennium BC

After the decline of Ur III Amorite rulers gained power in a number of Mesopotamian city-states, beginning in the Isin-Larsa period and peaking in the Old Babylonian period. In the north the Amorite ruler of Ekallatum, Shamshi-Adad I conquered Assur and formed the large, though short-lived Kingdom of Upper Mesoptamia. In the south Babylon became the major power under the Amorite ruler Sumu-la-El and his successors, including the notable Hammurabi. In the east, the Amorite kingdom of Mari arose, later to be destroyed by Hammurabi. Babylon itself would later be sacked by the Hittites and its empire assumed by the Kassites. To the northeast Yamhad ruled, later to be destroyed by the Hittites in 16th century BC. The city of Ebla, under the control of Yamhad in this period, also had Amorite rultership.

There is thought to have been an Amorite presence in Egypt beginning in the 19th century BC. The Fourteenth Dynasty of Egypt, centered in the Nile Delta, had rulers bearing Amorite names, such as Yakbmu. Furthermore, increasing evidence suggests that the succeeding Hyksos of Egypt were an amalgam of peoples from Syria, of which the Amorites were also part of. Based on temple architecture, Manfred Bietak argues for strong parallels between the religious practices of the Hyksos at Avaris with those of the area around Byblos, Ugarit, Alalakh, and Tell Brak, defining the "spiritual home" of the Hyksos as "in northernmost Syria and northern Mesopotamia", areas typically associated with Amorites at the time. In 1650 BC, the Hyksos went on to establish the Fifteenth Dynasty of Egypt and rule most of Lower and Middle Egypt contemporaneously with the Sixteenth and Seventeenth dynasties of Thebes during the chaotic Second Intermediate Period.

The Amorite era ended in Mesopotamia with the decline and fall, in the 16th century BC, of Babylon and other Amorite cities. The Kassites, who had been in the region for a century and a half, occupied Babylon and reconstituted its empire. In the far south the Sealand Dynasty took power. Later saw the rise of Mitanni and Assyria as powers. From the 15th century BC onward, the term Amurru is usually applied to the region extending north of Canaan as far as Kadesh on the Orontes River in northern Syria.

After the middle of the 2nd Millennium BC the Amorites of Syria came under the domination of first the Hittites and, from the 14th century BC, the Middle Assyrian Empire. They then appear to have been displaced or absorbed by a new wave of semi-nomadic West Semitic-speaking peoples, known collectively as the Ahlamu during the Late Bronze Age collapse. The Arameans rose to be the prominent group amongst the Ahlamu. From c. 1200 BC on, the Amorites disappeared from the pages of history, though the name re-appeared in the Hebrew Bible.

Language

The language was first attested in the 21st-20th centuries BC and was found to be closely related to the Canaanite, Aramaic and Sam'alian languages. In the 18th century BC at Mari Amorite scribes wrote in an Eshnunna dialect of east Semitic Akkadian language. The main sources for the extremely limited extant knowledge of the Amorite language are the proper names and loanwords, not Akkadian in style, that are preserved in such texts. Amorite proper names were found throughout Mesopotamia in the Old Babylonian period, as well as places as far afield as Alalakh in Syria and modern day Bahrain (Dilmun). They are also found in Egyptian records. 

Ugaritic is also a Northwest Semitic language and is possibly an Amorite dialect,

Religion
A bilingual list of the names of ten Amorite deities alongside Akkadian counterparts from the Old Babylonian period was translated in 2022. These deities are as follows:
 Dagan, who is identified with Enlil. Dagan was the supreme god in many cities in the Upper Euphrates, especially at sites such as Mari, Tuttul, and Terqa. Babylonian texts refer to the chief god of the Amorites as Amurru (Ilu Amurru, DMAR.TU), corresponding to their name for the ethnic group. They also identify his consort as the goddess Asheratum.
 Kamiš, an otherwise poorly attested deity largely known from Akkadian and Amorite theophoric names. He was significant at Ebla, where a month was named after him. The bilingual identifies him with the god Ea though other god lists identify him with Nergal.
 Aṯeratum, whose name is cognate with Asherah and is identified with Belet-ili.
 Yaraḫum, the moon god, who is named Yarikh at Ugarit. He is identified with the Mesopotamian Sin.
 Rašapum, equated with Nergal and also known from Ebla.
 A god with an incompletely reconstructed name (possibly /ʔārum/) who is identified with Išum.
 Ḫalamu, identified with Šubula, a deity in the netherworld god's circle.
 Ḫanatum, who is here identified with Ištar.
 Pidray, previously known only from the Late Bronze Age Ugaritic texts and later. In the bilingual list she is identified with Nanaya.
 aš-ti-ul-ḫa-al-ti, who is identified with Ištaran, the tutelary deity of the city of Der. 

This list is not thought to represent a full Amorite pantheon, as it does not include important members such as the sun and weather deities.

Biblical Amorites 

The term Amorites is used in the Bible to refer to certain highland mountaineers who inhabited the land of Canaan, described in Genesis as descendants of Canaan, the son of Ham. They are described as a powerful people of great stature "like the height of the cedars" who had occupied the land east and west of the Jordan. The height and strength mentioned in Amos 2:9 has led some Christian scholars, including Orville J. Nave, who wrote the Nave's Topical Bible, to refer to the Amorites as "giants".

In Deuteronomy, the Amorite king, Og, was described as the last "of the remnant of the Rephaim". The terms Amorite and Canaanite seem to be used more or less interchangeably, Canaan being more general and Amorite a specific component among the Canaanites who inhabited the land.

The Biblical Amorites seem to have originally occupied the region stretching from the heights west of the Dead Sea to Hebron, embracing "all Gilead and all Bashan", with the Jordan valley on the east of the river, the land of the "two kings of the Amorites", Sihon and Og ( and ). Sihon and Og were independent kings whose people were displaced from their land in battle with the Israelites - though in the case of the war led by Og/Bashan it appears none of them survived and the land became part of Israel. The Amorites seem to have been linked to the Jerusalem region, and the Jebusites may have been a subgroup of them. The southern slopes of the mountains of Judea are called the "mount of the Amorites".

The Book of Joshua speaks of the five kings of the Amorites were first defeated with great slaughter by Joshua. Then, more Amorite kings were defeated at the waters of Merom by Joshua. It is mentioned that in the days of Samuel, there was peace between them and the Israelites. The Gibeonites were said to be their descendants, being an offshoot of the Amorites who made a covenant with the Hebrews. When Saul later broke that vow and killed some of the Gibeonites, God is said to have sent a famine to Israel.

Origin 
 
There are a wide range of views regarding the Amorite homeland. One extreme is the view that /māt amurrim covered the whole area between the Euphrates and the Mediterranean Sea, the Arabian Peninsula included. The most common view is that the "homeland" of the Amorites was a limited area in central Syria identified with the mountainous region of Jebel Bishri.

Genetics
Skourtanioti et al. (2020) conducted ancient DNA analysis on 28 human remains dating to the Middle and Late Bronze Age from Tell Atchana, ancient Alalakh, a city which was founded by Amorites and contained a Hurrian minority later on, which the authors called an Amorite cultural assemblage. The analysis found that the inhabitants of Alalakh were a mixture of Copper age Levantines and Mesopotamians, and were genetically similar to contemporary Levantines from Syria (Ebla) and Lebanon (Sidon).

Racialism
The view that Amorites were fierce, tall nomads led to an anachronistic theory among some racialist writers in the 19th century that they were a tribe of "Aryan" warriors who at one point dominated the Israelites. The theory originated with Felix von Luschan, and did fit then-current models of Indo-European migrations; Luschan later abandoned this theory. Houston Stewart Chamberlain claimed that King David and Jesus were both Aryans of Amorite extraction. The argument was repeated by the Nazi ideologue Alfred Rosenberg.

However, the Amorites certainly spoke exclusively a Semitic language, followed Semitic religions of the Near East and had distinctly Semitic personal names. Their origins were believed to have been the lands immediately to the west of Mesopotamia, in the Levant (modern Syria), and so they are regarded as one of the Semitic peoples.

Amorite States 

In the Levant:
 Amurru kingdom
 Ebla's Third Dynasty
 Mukish
 Qatna
 Ugarit
 Yamhad

In Mesopotamia:
 Andarig
 Apum
 First Babylonian Dynasty
 Ekallatum
 Kurda
 Mari's Lim Dynasty
 Ṭābetu
 Kingdom of Upper Mesopotamia

In Egypt:
 Fourteenth Dynasty of Egypt
 Fifteenth Dynasty of Egypt?

References

Further reading 
 Albright, W. F., "The Amorite Form of the Name Ḫammurabi", The American Journal of Semitic Languages and Literatures, vol. 38, no. 2, pp. 140–41, 1922
 Bailey, Lloyd R, "Israelite ’Ēl Šadday and Amorite Bêl Šadê", Journal of Biblical Literature, vol. 87, no. 4, pp. 434–38, 1968
 Burke, S., "Entanglement, the Amorite koine, and the Amorite Cultures in the Levant", Aram Society for the Syro-Mesopotamian Studies 26, pp. 357–373, 2014
 Burke, Aaron A., "Amorites and Canaanites: Memory, Tradition, and Legacy in Ancient Israel and Judah", The Ancient Israelite World. Routledge, pp. 523-536, 2022 
 George, Andrew, and Manfred Krebernik, "Two Remarkable Vocabularies: Amorite-Akkadian Bilinguals!", Revue d’assyriologie et d’archéologie orientale 116.1, pp. 113-166, 2022
 Højlund, Flemming, "The Formation Of The Dilmun State And The Amorite Tribes", Proceedings of the Seminar for Arabian Studies, vol. 19, pp. 45–59, 1989
 Homsher, R. and Cradic, M., "The Amorite Problem: Resolving a Historical Dilemma", Levant 49, pp. 259–283, 2018
 Howard, J. Caleb, "Amorite Names through Time and Space", Journal of Semitic Studies, 2023
 Torczyner, H. Tur-Sinai, "The Amorite and the Amurrû of the Inscriptions", The Jewish Quarterly Review, vol. 39, no. 3, pp. 249–258, 1949
 Vidal, Jordi, "Prestige Weapons in an Amorite Context", Journal of Near Eastern Studies, vol. 70, no. 2, pp. 247–52, 2011
 Wallis, Louis, "Amorite Influence in the Religion of the Bible", The Biblical World, vol. 45, no. 4, pp. 216–23, 1915
 Wasserman, Nathan, and Yigal Bloch, "The Amorites: A Political History of Mesopotamia in the Early Second Millennium BCE", The Amorites, Brill, 2023 
 Zeynivand, Mohsen, "A Cylinder Seal With An Amorite Name From Tepe Musiyan, Deh Luran Plain", Journal of Cuneiform Studies, vol. 71, pp. 77–83, 2019

External links 

Cryptic lost Canaanite language decoded on 'Rosetta Stone'-like tablets - LiveScience - Tom Metcalfe- 30 January 2023 
 Two 3,800-year-old Cuneiform Tablets Found in Iraq Give First Glimpse of Hebrew Precursor - Haaretz - Jan 20, 2023
 Amorites in the Jewish Encyclopedia

 
States and territories established in the 3rd millennium BC
States and territories disestablished in the 18th century BC
States and territories disestablished in the 16th century BC
Canaan
Hebrew Bible nations
Semitic-speaking peoples
Ancient peoples of the Near East
21st-century BC establishments
Giants in the Hebrew Bible